Headin' for God's Country is a 1943 American action film directed by William Morgan and written by Houston Branch and Elizabeth Meehan. The film stars William Lundigan, Virginia Dale, Harry Davenport, Harry Shannon, Addison Richards and John F. Hamilton. The film was released on August 26, 1943, by Republic Pictures.

Plot

Cast  
William Lundigan as Michael Banyan
Virginia Dale as Laurie Lane
Harry Davenport as Clem Adams
Harry Shannon as Albert Ness
Addison Richards as District Commissioner
John F. Hamilton as Hilary Higgins 
Eddie Acuff as Hugo Higgins
Wade Crosby as Jim Talbot
Skelton Knaggs as Jeff
John Bleifer as Nickolai
Eddy Waller as Hank
Charles Lung as Willie Soba 
Ernie Adams as Chuck
Eddie Lee as Gim Lung
James B. Leong as Japanese Officer
Anna Q. Nilsson as Mrs. Nilsson
Ace the Wonder Dog as Flash

References

External links
 

1943 films
American action films
1940s action films
Republic Pictures films
Films directed by William Morgan (director)
American black-and-white films
1940s English-language films
1940s American films